The Saturn Awards for Best Writing is a Saturn Award presented by the Academy of Science Fiction, Fantasy & Horror Films.

Unlike most awards rewarding writing in films, it recognizes only the writer(s) of the screenplay, and not those of the story.

Winners and nominees

1970s

1980s

1990s

2000s

2010s

2020s

Multiple nominations
7 nominations
Guillermo del Toro
Peter Jackson
Quentin Tarantino
Fran Walsh

6 nominations
Philippa Boyens
James Cameron

5 nominations
Christopher Nolan

4 nominations
Lawrence Kasdan
David Koepp
George Miller

3 nominations
J. J. Abrams
William Peter Blatty
Alex Garland
Drew Goddard
David Hayter
Rick Jaffa and Amanda Silver
John Logan
George Lucas
Christopher Markus and Stephen McFeely
Nicholas Meyer
Jordan Peele
Andrew Stanton
The Wachowskis

2 nominations
Woody Allen
Michael Arndt
Brad Bird
Jeffrey Boam
C. Robert Cargill
Joel and Ethan Coen
Chris Columbus
Frank Darabont
Scott Derrickson
Michael Dougherty
Scott Frank
Tony Gilroy
Michael Goldenberg
William Goldman
David S. Goyer
Michael Green
Dan Harris
James V. Hart
Terry Hayes
Tom Holland
Spike Jonze
Charlie Kaufman
Steve Kloves
Don Mancini
Melissa Mathison
Christopher McQuarrie
Edward Neumeier
Jonathan Nolan
Dan O'Bannon
Matt Reeves
Matthew Robbins
Gary Ross
Eric Roth
Steven Spielberg
Wesley Strick
Andrew Kevin Walker
Joss Whedon

Multiple wins
4 wins
 Christopher Nolan

3 wins
 William Peter Blatty
 James Cameron

2 wins
 Lawrence Kasdan
 Jonathan Nolan
 Quentin Tarantino

External links
 https://web.archive.org/web/20100209012608/http://www.saturnawards.org/past.html#writing
 https://www.imdb.com/event/ev0000004/1975

Writing